Achimenes grandiflora (Schltdl.) DC. is a plant species in the genus Achimenes, family Gesneriaceae. It is native to Mexico and Central America, growing in mountainous regions from Chihuahua to Nicaragua. It is cultivated as an ornamental in other places because of its showy purple flowers.

References

Gesnerioideae
Flora of Mexico
Flora of Guatemala
Flora of Nicaragua
Flora of Honduras
Plants described in 1833